The Public Health Achievement Medal is a decoration of the United States Public Health Service presented to members of the United States Public Health Service Commissioned Officer Corps and to members of any Uniformed Services of the United States whose accomplishments or achievements are of outstanding or unique significance to the missions of the Corps. It is the ninth-highest award awarded by the United States Public Health Service Commissioned Corps.

Criteria
The PHS Achievement Medal is awarded to an officer for superior efforts or outcomes in accomplishing a program's mission. This could include recognition of the advancement of program objectives, sustained above-average accomplishments, or superior dedication to duty over a relatively short period of time.

See also
 Awards and decorations of the Public Health Service
 Awards and decorations of the United States government

References

External links
Revision to the USPHS Commissioned Corps Personnel Manual

United States Department of Health and Human Services
Achievement Medal